Betaherpesvirinae is a subfamily of viruses in the order Herpesvirales and in the family Herpesviridae. Mammals serve as natural hosts. There are 26 species in this subfamily, divided among 5 genera. Diseases associated with this subfamily include: human cytomegalovirus (HHV-5): congenital CMV infection; HHV-6: 'sixth disease' (also known as roseola infantum or exanthem subitum); HHV-7: symptoms analogous to the 'sixth disease'.

Genera 
Betaherpesvirinae consists of the following five genera:

 Cytomegalovirus
 Muromegalovirus
 Proboscivirus
 Quwivirus
 Roseolovirus

Structure 
Viruses in Betaherpesvirinae are enveloped, with icosahedral, spherical to pleomorphic, and  Round geometries, and T=16 symmetry. The diameter is around 150-200 nm. Genomes are linear and non-segmented, around 140-240kb in length.

Life cycle 
Viral replication is nuclear, and is lysogenic. Entry into the host cell is achieved by attachment of the viral glycoproteins to host receptors, which mediates endocytosis. Replication follows the dsDNA bidirectional replication model. DNA templated transcription, with some alternative splicing mechanism is the method of transcription. Translation takes place by leaky scanning. The virus exits the host cell by nuclear egress and  budding.
Betaherpesviruses typically have highly restricted host ranges, although essentially all mammals, reptiles, and birds are infected with at least one betaherpesvirus species. Transmission routes are transplacental, transplantation, blood transfusion, body fluids, urine, and saliva.

Betaherpesvirinae establish latency (site where virus lies dormant until reactivated) in CD34+ myeloid progenitor cells and CD14+ monocytes. This is different from Alphaherpesvirinae, which establish latency in neurons, and Gammaherpesvirinae, which establish latency in memory B cells.

Human health 
There are four known member species of the Betaherpesvirinae subfamily that are infectious for humans:
 Human cytomegalovirus (HCMV), also known as Human herpesvirus 5 (HHV-5),
 Human herpesvirus 6A and 6B (HHV-6A and HHV-6B), which were classified as distinct species in 2012,
 Human herpesvirus 7 (HHV-7)

Human cytomegalovirus (HCMV, HHV-5) "seems to have a large impact on immune parameters in later life and may contribute to increased morbidity and eventual mortality." Human herpesvirus 6A (HHV-6A) has been described as more neurovirulent, and as such is more frequently found in patients with neuroinflammatory diseases such as multiple sclerosis. Both human herpesvirus 6B (HHV-6B) and human herpesvirus 7 (HHV-7), as well as other viruses, can cause a skin condition in infants known as exanthema subitum, roseola infantum (rose rash of infants) or the sixth disease.

References

External links 
 
 Viralzone: Betaherpesvirinae
 ICTV

 
Herpesviridae
Virus subfamilies